Cetobacterium somerae is a Gram-negative, microaerotolerant, non-spore-forming and rod-shaped bacterium from the genus of Cetobacterium which has been isolated from human feces. Cetobacterium somerae occur in intestinal tracts of freshwater fish.
Cetobacterium somerae produces cobalamin.

References

Fusobacteriota
Bacteria described in 2003